The eSourcing Capability Model (eSCM) is a framework developed by ITSqc at Carnegie Mellon University in order to improve the relationship between IT Services providers and their customers.

These services can be very different: IT outsourcing, IT hosting, application development and maintenance outsourcing, networking services, business process outsourcing.  

eSCM is twofold: eSCM-CL for Clients and eSCM-SP for Service Providers. These two models are consistent, symmetrical  and complementary for each side of the client-provider relationship and this is the strength and the uniqueness of this model.

See also 

 eSCM-CL
 eSCM-SP
 Capability Maturity Model

External links 
 Information from ITSqc, Carnegie Mellon University
 Frequently Asked Questions (FAQ) about eSCM model - Spanish/Español
 What is eSourcing?

Information technology management